Synodontis thysi is a species of upside-down catfish native to Guinea and Sierra Leone where it is found in the Little Scarcies, Jong, Rokel, Kolenté and Konkouré Rivers.  This species grows to a length of  SL.

References

External links 

thysi
Freshwater fish of West Africa
Taxa named by Max Poll
Fish described in 1971